Afro-Brazilian feminism is a social movement that seeks to address systemic violence and discrimination against Afro-Brazilian women. Afro-Brazilian women created their feminism in order to mitigate the lack of space and representation given to them in mainstream/white feminism in Brazil. Overall, Afro-Brazilian feminism addresses the intersectionality between racism, sexism, and classism, due to the social and economic exclusion of Afro-Brazilian women in Brazil.

Afro-Brazilian Women Organizations

Pretas Simoa 
Named after Tia Simoa, a freed enslaved woman who led the 1881 Jangadeiros Strike in Fortaleza, Pretas Simoa (English: Black Simoa) is a black female-led activist group. It is situated in the province of Fortaleza Cairi. Pretas Simoa focuses on empowering Afro-Brazilian women by reclaiming black woman's historical and contemporary representation in Brazilian society.  They are active in deconstructing the hyper-sexualization of black women in media and everyday life. Additionally, Pretas Simoa seeks to discover the omitted history of black women in both contemporary and historical resistance.  Pretas Simoa's hope in rewriting Afro-Brazilian women as protagonists rather than sidenotes or victims in their own history, is to "strengthen the bonds of their own identity".
More recently, in a statement titled "From the slave quarters to the post card: My flesh is not of your Carnival", Pretas Simoa speaks out on the hyper-sexualization of black women and the term "mulatta" during the Carnival season. Pretas Simoa calls out the hypocrisy of the media during this time, in which the media ecstatically looks for light-skinned black women to fill the role of the Globeleza, a woman who dances samba in body paint to advertise the Carnival season. Pretas Simoa calls out this hypocrisy, because it is only during this season that black women receive glorification and praise in the media. Outside of Carnival season, black women are ignored, underrepresented, and depicted as slaves or domestic workers in the media. Pretas Simoa also discusses the psychological and violent impact the hyper-sexualization of black women has on black women's daily lives. In their statement they declare "This violence is of a moral order, as it slanders us and hurts our honor and reputation; it's physical in jeopardizing the integrity of our body as we are seen as "available"; and also psychological, as it implies directly the perception that we have of ourselves and interfere with our affectionate and sexual behavior that sustains this cruel hyper-sexualized identity in which we are seen and often ends up implicated in the reflection that we see in the mirror".

Odara 
Odara, also known as Instituto de Mulher Negra, is an Afro-Brazilian feminist organization that is oriented towards improving the "socio-political and economic inclusion of black women and their families in society". Odara aims to accomplish socio-political and economic inclusion by tackling individual and systemic discrimination such as: lower salary, less access to higher learning, sterilization, unemployment and psychological and emotional scarring from the above mentioned discrimination.
Several projects that Odara has worked on include: Gol Plate, Weaving the Black Women Network and Teacher Training Program to Work with Law 10.639. Gol Plate focuses on training black women as political actors in democratic participation. Weaving the Black Women Network was a project organized to strengthen black women's organizations and combating racism, sexism and Lesbophobia through public policy initiative to ensured the inclusion of Afro Brazilian women in "the new development cycle of the Northeast and the fight against violence". Lastly, Teacher Training Program to Work with Law 10.639 facilitates a partnership between civil society and the federal government in order to ensure the preservation of Afro-Brazilian culture in Brazilian society. In all, Odara is an organization that focuses on the socio-political inclusion and empowerment of Afro-Brazilian women.

Afro-Brazilian Women Protests

Demonstration at Marcha das Vadias- Slut Walk 
During the 2014 Marcha das Vadias (SlutWalk), a group of black women organized by Coletivo Negracao held demonstrations that called attention to violence against black women. The goal of this demonstration was to highlight the way black women's dual identities as black and women intersect to create dual oppression, different from that of the predominately white feminists at Marcha das Vadias. During the demonstrations, women chanted things such as "Claudie Ferreria resists", referring and standing in solidarity to the black woman who was murdered and then dragged on the street attached to a military police van in Rio de Janeiro. In addition to the chants, phrases such as "This is not an invitation", were written on the bodies of the demonstrators to protest sexual abuse and sexism against black women.
The protest proceeded to divide into two locations at a women's police station and Cidade Baixa. At the women's police station, the focus was violence against women perpetrated by the police. Open letters with demands, such as better service conditions at the station, increased vacancies in shelters for female victims of violence, and violence prevention programs. Protesters as well laid in the street to symbolically depict the systemic violence against black women in Brazil. The sector of the protest that continued to Cidade Baixa, marked the pavement with graffiti at places where sexist, racist, and homophobic events occurred. One of the demonstration stops was at Pingium bar, in which protesters booed, kissed, and burned the entrance carpet along with their bras.

Marcha das Mulheres Negras 
The Marcha das Mulheres Negras, which translates to "Black Women's March", took place on November 18, 2015. Marcha das Mulheres Negras gathered more than 10,000 black women from all socioeconomic backgrounds, ranging from domestic workers to politicians and professors. This march was the first ever national Afro-Brazilian women's march in Brazil. Together they marched against poverty, violence, and racism. Slogans such as "I do not accept my place in the kitchen" and "I want to be in the revolution" were chanted.  Major highways and streets of the city were cut off and blocked by protesters. These actions were symbolic of black women reclaiming space for themselves outside of the periphery of Brazilian society. After the march, a group of protesters met with the president and Nilma Lino Gomes, Brazil's minister of women, racial equality, and human rights.

Ivana Braga, an organizer for the march stated, "As we leave this march, I know that the black woman's fight in Brazil is stronger...We won't be as invisible any more, and our concerns and needs will start to be addressed on the political agenda."

The Current State of Afro-Brazilian Women in Brazil

Violence 
According to Mapa da Violencia 2015, Homocido de Mulheres No Brasil, translated by the Root's Fighting Poverty, Plagued by Violence: Why 10,000 Black Women in Brazil Marched for Their Rights, "violence against black women in Brazil increased by 54 percent in 2003 and 2013. In 2013 alone, more than 2,800 black women died from violence. Violence against white women in the same 10-year period decreased 18 percent."  Additionally, of the 60,000 homicides in Brazil each year, more than 40,000 are Afro-Brazilian, meaning black women are losing their family members at a higher rate than white women, and thus suffering greater rates of psychological and emotional trauma than their white counterparts.
According to Newsweek's Why the Progress Made by Brazil's Activists Might Now Unravel, "of 16 percent of the killings in Rio over the last five years, and from 2010 to 2013, 79 percent of those victims were black". Under the current presidency of Michel Temer, proposals set forth by the Rousseff administration to decrease homicides through targeted police training and monitoring have been discarded.

Workplace Discrimination 
Statistics from Mapa de Violence 2015 show that on average black women earn approximately 364 dollars per month,  "44 percent of the average pay for white men, 75 percent of the pay for black men and 60 percent of the pay for white women".

Body Exploitation

Carnival 
In 2013, Nayara Justino was voted as the Globeleza, a samba dancing representative for the carnival season, only to be removed shortly after for allegedly being too dark. Justino was replaced by a much lighter skinned black woman with mixed descent. Justino faced racist harassment via social media, and was given no concrete reason by Globo, the company behind the Globeleza as to why she was replaced.
Traditionally, the role of the Globeleza is given to lighter skinned black women, cited as perhaps the only time black women are represented and celebrated in Brazilian media, representative of the hyper-sexualization of black women.

Sexual Tourism 

Due to the abolition process with no minimum humanitarian base, the image of Afro-Brazilian-Woman is often linked to prostitution, and this was accentuated even more in the years of military dictatorship (De Politica Politica), where the image of a country of marvels was sold as treats for foreigners.

Temer Presidency 
Temer is determined to cut back on spending for health care, education, social programs, and "cap minimum wage increase", policies that directly harm Afro-Brazilians and the poor. Temer's actions are in direct opposition to the political allies that Afro-Brazilians found during the Lula and Rousseff administrations. Under Lula and Rousseff, Afro-Brazilians received state help to get out of poverty and received university aid though affirmative action policies. Temer has downsized Brazil's ministry of racial equality, negatively impacting affirmative action, black history education programs, and anti-racism education initiatives. Additionally, despite high rates of violence towards Afro-Brazilians by authorities, proposals set by Temer's predecessor Dilma Rousseff to decrease homicides through targeted police training and monitoring have been discarded by the Temer administration.

See also
 Feminism in Brazil

References 

Feminism
Feminism in Brazil